George Washington Hotel can refer to:

 George Washington Hotel (New York City)
 The George Washington Hotel (Pennsylvania), in Washington, Pennsylvania
 The George Washington Hotel (Winchester, Virginia)
 Hotel George Washington (Jacksonville), Florida

See also
Washington Hotel (disambiguation)
George Washington House (disambiguation)

Architectural disambiguation pages